Arcyptera tornosi, the Iberian banded grasshopper, is a species of slant-faced grasshopper in the family Acrididae. It is found on the Iberian Peninsula.

The IUCN conservation status of Arcyptera tornosi is "LC", least concern, with no immediate threat to the species' survival. The IUCN status was assessed in 2016.

References

Further reading

External links

 

Gomphocerinae
Endemic insects of the Iberian Peninsula